Devipatnam is a village in Devipatnam Mandal, located in Alluri Sitharama Raju district of the Indian state of Andhra Pradesh.

References 

Villages in Devipatnam mandal